The fifth season of Nouvelle Star began on February 28, 2007. Once again all four judges returned and Virginie Efira was hosting her second season. 
Auditions were held in the following cities:
 Rennes 
 Marseilles
 Lyon 
 Bordeaux
 Lille 
 Paris 
The winner of the season was Julien Doré over Tigane Drammeh.

Contestants
Top 10 Finalists

Elimination chart

External links 
 Official site

Season 05
2007 French television seasons